Tamra's OC Wedding is an American reality documentary television series on Bravo that debuted on September 2, 2013. The three-part miniseries chronicles the weeks prior to the wedding of Tamra Barney and Eddie Judge as well as the wedding itself — which took place on June 15, 2013, at the Monarch Beach Resort in Dana Point, California.

The series is the second spin-off of The Real Housewives of Orange County, following Date My Ex: Jo & Slade.

Cast

Main
 Tamra Barney – housewife on The Real Housewives of Orange County; joined the series before the third season.
 Eddie Judge – Tamra's fiancé.

Supporting
 Heather Dubrow – close friend of Tamra's and fellow castmate on The Real Housewives of Orange County.
 Vicki Gunvalson – close friend of Tamra's and fellow castmate on The Real Housewives of Orange County.
Ricky Santana – Tamra's man of honor.
Terry Dubrow – Heather's husband; close friend of Tamra and Eddie's.
Diann Valentine – Tamra's wedding planner.

Episodes

References

External links
 
 
 

2010s American reality television series
2013 American television series debuts
2013 American television series endings
American television spin-offs
Bravo (American TV network) original programming
English-language television shows
Reality television spin-offs
The Real Housewives spin-offs
Television shows set in California
Wedding television shows